Kolpakovo is a rural locality in Kolpakovsky Selsoviet Rural Settlement, Kurchatovsky District, Kursk Oblast, Russia. Population:

Geography 
The village is located on the Reut River, 46 km south-west of Kursk, 14 km south-west of the district center – the town Kurchatov, 7 km from the selsoviet center – Novosergeyevka.

 Climate
Kolpakovo has a warm-summer humid continental climate (Dfb in the Köppen climate classification).

Transport 

The rural locality is situated 53 km from Kursk Vostochny Airport, 121 km from Belgorod International Airport and 253 km from Voronezh Peter the Great Airport.

References

Notes

Sources

Rural localities in Kurchatovsky District, Kursk Oblast
Lgovsky Uyezd